Bruce J. Avolio is an American academic in the field of leadership studies. He is the Professor of Management, Mark Pigott Chair in Business Strategic Leadership, and executive director of the Center for Leadership & Strategic Thinking in the Foster School of Business at the University of Washington. He is a fellow of the American Psychological Society, the Academy of Management, the American Psychological Association, the Society for Industrial and Organizational Psychology, and the Gerontological Society of America.

Bibliography
Full Range Leadership Development (2011)
The High Impact Leader (with Fred Luthans) (2008)
Leadership Development in Balance: Made/born (2005)
Improving Organizational Effectiveness Through Transformational Leadership (with Bernard Bass) (1994)

References

External links
Faculty profile

Living people
State University of New York at Oneonta alumni
University of Akron alumni
University of Washington faculty
Fellows of the American Psychological Association
Fellows of the Association for Psychological Science
Leadership scholars
Fellows of the Gerontological Society of America
Year of birth missing (living people)
American psychologists